Adams is a town in Adams County in the U.S. state of Wisconsin. The population was 1,378 at the 2020 census. The city of Adams is located within the town. The ghost town of Adams Center was also located in the town.

Geography

Demographics
As of the census of 2000, there were 1,267 people, 547 households, and 363 families residing in the town. The population density was 25.1 people per square mile (9.7/km). There were 856 housing units at an average density of 16.9 per square mile (6.5/km). The racial makeup of the town was 97.55% White, 0.32% Black or African American, 0.71% Native American, 0.32% Asian, 0.63% from other races, and 0.47% from two or more races. Hispanic or Latino of any race were 1.66% of the population.

There were 547 households, out of which 22.7% had children under the age of 18 living with them, 53.6% were married couples living together, 7.7% had a female householder with no husband present, and 33.6% were non-families. 27.1% of all households were made up of individuals, and 11.9% had someone living alone who was 65 years of age or older. The average household size was 2.32 and the average family size was 2.75.

In the town, the population was spread out, with 21.1% under the age of 18, 7.3% from 18 to 24, 27.0% from 25 to 44, 27.6% from 45 to 64, and 17.0% who were 65 years of age or older. The median age was 42 years. For every 100 females, there were 102.7 males. For every 100 females age 18 and over, there were 101.6 males.

The median income for a household in the town was $34,286, and the median income for a family was $38,482. Males had a median income of $32,171 versus $22,188 for females. The per capita income for the town was $18,225. About 4.9% of families and 9.0% of the population were below the poverty line, including 8.4% of those under age 18 and 14.4% of those age 65 or over.

References

External links
Adams-Friendship website

Towns in Adams County, Wisconsin
Towns in Wisconsin